Highlands High School is a suburban, public secondary school in the Natrona Heights neighborhood of Harrison Township in the U.S. state of Pennsylvania. It is part of the Highlands School District and has a current enrollment of about 800 students in grades nine through twelve.

Extracurriculars
The district offers a variety of clubs, activities and sports. Highlands School District is a member of the WPIAL and PIAA. Highlands School District teams compete at the class AAA or AA level.

The district offers the following sports programs:

 Boys - baseball 9–12, basketball 7–12, cross country 9–12, marching band 9–12, football 7–12, golf 9–12, soccer 7–12, swimming 9–12, tennis 9–12, track & field 7–12, wrestling 9-12
 Girls - basketball 7–12, cross country 9–12, marching band (sometimes 8 but usually) 9–12, soccer 7–12, softball 7–12, swimming 9–12, tennis 9–12, track & field 7–12, volleyball 9-12

Notable alumni

 Cookie Gilchrist, former NFL player
 Dick Modzelewski, former NFL player
 Ed Modzelewski, former NFL player
 Cliff Montgomery, former NFL player

See also
 List of high schools in Pennsylvania

References

External links
 Highlands High School webpage
 Highlands High School newspaper website
 Highlands School District website

Public high schools in Pennsylvania
Educational institutions established in 1969
Schools in Allegheny County, Pennsylvania
Education in Pittsburgh area
1969 establishments in Pennsylvania